Grantley is a census-designated place (CDP) in York County, Pennsylvania, United States. The population was 3,628 at the 2010 census.

Geography
Grantley is located at  (39.942498, -76.730131) in Spring Garden Township, adjacent to the city of York.

Demographics

At the 2000 census there were 3,580 people, 801 households, and 550 families living in the CDP. The population density was 2,155.3 people per square mile (832.7/km). There were 830 housing units at an average density of 499.7/sq mi (193.1/km).  The racial makeup of the CDP was 96.54% White, 1.37% African American, 0.03% Native American, 0.70% Asian, 0.03% Pacific Islander, 0.56% from other races, and 0.78% from two or more races. Hispanic or Latino of any race were 2.21%.

Of the 801 households 29.0% had children under the age of 18 living with them, 57.8% were married couples living together, 8.0% had a female householder with no husband present, and 31.3% were non-families. 20.5% of households were one person and 10.6% were one person aged 65 or older. The average household size was 2.55 and the average family size was 2.85.

The age distribution was 12.3% under the age of 18, 46.8% from 18 to 24, 12.7% from 25 to 44, 15.3% from 45 to 64, and 13.0% 65 or older. The median age was 21 years. For every 100 females, there were 77.3 males. For every 100 females age 18 and over, there were 75.3 males.

The median household income was $57,039 and the median family income  was $77,216. Males had a median income of $60,292 versus $29,250 for females. The per capita income for the CDP was $28,703. About 4.7% of families and 12.7% of the population were below the poverty line, including 15.4% of those under age 18 and 1.7% of those age 65 or over.

References

Census-designated places in York County, Pennsylvania
Census-designated places in Pennsylvania